Sean Joyce may also refer to:
Sean William Joyce (born 1967), English footballer
Sean M. Joyce, Deputy Director of the US Federal Bureau of Investigation